Ralph "Woody" Woodrow Campbell (January 31, 1925 – November 2004) was a Canadian basketball player who competed in the 1952 Summer Olympics.

Campbell was part of the Canadian basketball team, which was eliminated after the group stage in the 1952 tournament. He played all six matches.

References

External links
profile
Woody Campbell's obituary

1925 births
2004 deaths
Basketball players at the 1952 Summer Olympics
Canadian men's basketball players
Canadian people of Scottish descent
Olympic basketball players of Canada
Basketball players from Windsor, Ontario